Maximiliano Thous Orts, (1875 - 1947), also known as Maximilià Thous i Orts, was a Spanish journalist, writer, filmmaker, and playwright.

Biography 
Although he was born in Asturias, his family were from Alicante, but when he became older, they moved to Valencia. While at Valencia, he studied law at the University of Valencia, but he then quit studying to learn literature and writing.

In 1909, he wrote the lyrics to Himne de l'Exposició, which is officially the anthem of the Valencian Community.

In 1923, he began directing films.

During the 1930s, Maximiliano was a host of a radio program, named Radio Valencia Cadena SER. However, some of the recording were lost until 2017.

Works

Filmography 

 La alegría del batallón
 La Bruja
 La Dolores
 Nit d'albaes

Newspapers 

 El Guante Blanco

See also
 Spanish cinema

References

Spanish journalists
Film directors from the Valencian Community
Writers from the Valencian Community
1875 births
1947 deaths